Maxim Komissarov (born December 24, 1972) is a Kazakhstani hockey player currently playing for Ertis Pavlodar. He played was a member of the 2007 Kazakhstan men's national ice hockey team. He played for Ust-Kamenogorsk Torpedo in his junior career.

Career statistics

References

Living people
1972 births
Sportspeople from Oskemen
Kazakhstani ice hockey players
Soviet ice hockey players
Asian Games gold medalists for Kazakhstan
Asian Games silver medalists for Kazakhstan
Medalists at the 1999 Asian Winter Games
Medalists at the 2003 Asian Winter Games
Medalists at the 2007 Asian Winter Games
Ice hockey players at the 1999 Asian Winter Games
Ice hockey players at the 2003 Asian Winter Games
Ice hockey players at the 2007 Asian Winter Games
Asian Games medalists in ice hockey
HC Sibir Novosibirsk players
Kazakhmys Satpaev players
Kazzinc-Torpedo players
Yertis Pavlodar players